St. John's Church is a historic Episcopal church located near Sweet Hall, King William County, Virginia, United States.  It was constructed in 1734 and is a one-story, "T"-shaped brick building.  It measures 50 feet, 3 inches, by 20 feet, 2 inches, with a 24 feet wide, 28 feet, 9 inch, wing. St. John's is the
only surviving colonial church in King William County to remain in the Episcopal charge. This church is also important in that it is associated with Carter Braxton, Signer of the Declaration of Independence, who regularly attended worship there.

It was listed on the National Register of Historic Places in 1973.

References

External links
Official website of Old St. John's Church, State Route 30 vicinity, West Point, King William County, VA
Old St. John's Church, State Route 30 vicinity, West Point, King William County, VA: 3 photos at Historic American Buildings Survey

Colonial architecture in Virginia
Episcopal churches in Virginia
Historic American Buildings Survey in Virginia
King William County, Virginia
National Register of Historic Places in King William County, Virginia
Churches on the National Register of Historic Places in Virginia
Churches completed in 1734
18th-century Episcopal church buildings